Jukka Perko (born 18 February 1968 in Huittinen, Finland) is a Finnish saxophonist.

Biography 
Perko first became known in Finland by playing at the 1986 Pori Jazz Festival. His international career started when he played in the big band of Dizzy Gillespie the following year, with which he toured in the following two years through the US and Europe. In addition at this time  he studied music at the Sibelius Academy. Dort Lernte is the Vibraphonist known by Severi Pyysalo, by which he regularly collaborated.

In the period 1989 to 1994 Perko played with the UMO Jazz Orchestra, afterwards he concentrated on his solo career. He led different bands (including the Trio Perko-Pyysalo-Viinikainen) and collaborated with musicians like McCoy Tyner, Red Rodney and Niels-Henning Ørsted Pedersen among others. In addition he works as an interpreter of classical music with orchestras such as the Helsinki Philharmonic Orchestra and the Avanti-Chamber Orchestra. Since 1990 he has been teaching at the Sibelius Academy.

Discography

Solo albums 
 1989: Portrait by Heart (Andania), with Jukka Perko Quartet (Kirmo Lintinen, Eerik Siikasaari, Marko Timonen)
 2000: Music of Olavi Virta (Blue Note), with Hurmio-Orkesteri (Manuel Dunkel, Lasse Lindgren, Teppo Mäkynen)
 2002: Kaanaamaa (Blue Note)
 2004: Kuunnelmia (Blue Note), with Severi Pyysalo, Teemu Viinikainen
 2006: Retrospective (Blue Note)
 2008: Maan Korvessa (Levypallo), with Severi Pyysalo, Teemu Viinikainen
 2008: Profeetta (Columbia), with Mikko Kuustonen
 2011: Avara (Blue Note)
 2012: Streamline Jazztet (Blue Note)
 2013: Martan Ja Rudolfin Joulu (EMI), with Johanna Iivanainen
 2016: Invisible Man (ACT), with Jarmo Saari, Teemu Viinikainen
 2017: Dizzy (We Jazz Records), with Jukka Perko Tritone

Collaborations 
 With Jukka Linkola Band
 1992: Snowlight (YLE Radiomafia)

 With The Poppoo
 1993: Garden of Time (Chandos Records), with Severi Pyysalo, Marko Timonen, Eerik Siiksaari, Mongo Aaltonen
 1995: Uuno Kailas (Ondine Octopus), with Vesa-Matti Loiri, Severi Pyysalo, Eerik Siikasaari, Marko Timonen, Jarmo Saari
 1998: Varia (Pori Jazz Productions), with Severi Pyysalo, Ville Houlman, Teppo Mäkynen

 With Iiro Rantala
 2015: It Takes Two To Tango (ACT)

References

External links 

Finnish jazz saxophonists
Male saxophonists
Finnish jazz composers
Finnish male musicians
Finnish music educators
1968 births
Living people
21st-century saxophonists
Male jazz composers
21st-century male musicians